A heckler is a person who shouts an uninvited comment at a performance or event.

Heckler or The Heckler may also refer to:

 Heckler (character), a fictional character by DC comics
 Heckler (surname)
 Heckler & Koch, a German weapons manufacturing company
 The Georgetown Heckler, an undergraduate humor magazine at Georgetown University
 The Heckler (newspaper), a satirical sports newspaper
 Hecklers, a programme on BBC Radio 4
 Heckler (film), a documentary starring Jamie Kennedy, which takes swipes at not only hecklers who pester comedians, but also at film critics
 The Heckler (1940 film), a 1940 comedy film
 The Heckler (2015 film), a 2015 comedy film

See also
 Heckle (disambiguation)